Erling Nielsen (2 January 1935 - 15 September 1996) was a Danish footballer. During his club career he played for Boldklubben 1909. He earned 3 caps for the Denmark national football team, and was in the finals squad for the 1964 European Nations' Cup.

References

External links
Profile at DBU

1935 births
Danish men's footballers
Denmark international footballers
1964 European Nations' Cup players
1996 deaths
Association football midfielders